Poverty Hill is an unincorporated community in Sierra County, California, in the United States.

References

Unincorporated communities in Sierra County, California
Unincorporated communities in California